Mylothra creseritis is a moth in the family Autostichidae. It was described by Edward Meyrick in 1907. It is found in Balochistan.

The wingspan is 19–20 mm. The forewings are whitish ochreous, very finely and thinly sprinkled with fuscous. The stigmata and a pre-tornal dot are very faintly indicated by similar irroration (sprinkles), the plical beneath the first discal. The hindwings are pale grey irrorated with dark grey.

References

Moths described in 1907
Mylothra